Löffelstelzen Transmitter is a broadcasting facility of SWR at Bad Mergentheim-Löffelstelzen in northern Baden-Württemberg, Germany. It was inaugurated at the beginning of the 1950s and used at those days a guyed mast, which was insulated against ground, because it was used for medium-wave broadcasting with a butterfly antenna for FM- and TV-transmission on its top. Later this mast was replaced by a concrete tower, which carried an antenna for FM-/TV-broadcasting on its top and a cage and a wire antenna for medium-wave broadcasting at its site.
This tower was replaced between 1998 and 2000 by a 179 metre tall concrete tower. This tower is not equipped with an antenna for medium wave broadcasting, because this was ceased in 2000 at the Löffelstelzen transmission site.

External links
 
 http://www.skyscraperpage.com/cities/?buildingID=54838

See also
 List of towers

Radio masts and towers in Germany
Buildings and structures in Main-Tauber-Kreis
1950s establishments in West Germany
Towers completed in the 1950s